The Wolf River is a river in the municipality of French River, Sudbury District in Northeastern Ontario, Canada. It is in the Great Lakes Basin and is a right tributary of the Wolseley River.

Course
The river begins at an unnamed lake in geographic Cosby Township and heads east, passes the communities of Noëlville and Chartrand Corner, then turns northwest and reaches Lac Viau on the Wolseley River. The Wolseley flows via the French River to Georgian Bay on Lake Huron.

See also  
List of rivers of Ontario

References

Sources

Rivers of Sudbury District